Mick Barry (born 17 September 1964) is an Irish People Before Profit–Solidarity politician who has been a Teachta Dála (TD) for the Cork North-Central constituency since the 2016 general election.

According to the Irish Examiner, Barry was "a leading figure in the Cork and national campaigns" against household and water charges in the 2010s.

Political career

1989 to 2016
Dick Spring expelled Barry, alongside Joe Higgins, Clare Daly, Ruth Coppinger and 10 others, from the Labour Party in 1989 for their membership of the Militant tendency.

Barry was first elected as a member of Cork City Council in June 2004 and re-elected in June 2009 and May 2014 (both times on the first count). He also stood as a candidate in the Cork North-Central constituency at the 2002, 2007 and 2011 general elections.

On 1 May 2013, gardaí arrested five members of the Campaign Against Home and Water Taxes, including Barry and fellow Cork City Councillor Ted Tynan of the Workers' Party, during a midday protest inside the St Patrick's Street branch of the Bank of Ireland in the city. People gathered on the street. Cllr Tynan said he felt a need to stand up against austerity.

In the 2010s Barry campaigned on a number of issues locally and nationally, notably the Anti-Bin Tax Campaign with the Householders Against Service Charges (HASC) in Cork, In support of local services in the Cork area such as the cutbacks in bus services, and against the building of a private hospital on the public grounds of Cork University Hospital, and social housing. He called for a ban on home repossessions and considered a controversial Gateway employment scheme to be "slave labour". He called for standing orders to be suspended and proposed a motion condemning the jailing of five activists opposing a proposed tax on water.

2016 to present: Member of the Dáil
A founding member of the Anti-Austerity Alliance (AAA), Barry was elected for the AAA–PBP group, in the 2016 general election, on his fourth attempt. At the 2020 general election, he was re-elected as a Solidarity–People Before Profit TD.

Personal life
Barry was born in Columbus, Ohio in 1964. His family returned to Ireland in 1971 when he was 8 years old, and moved to Rathfarnham in Dublin. Barry moved to Cork City in 1991 and has remained a resident ever since, living in the suburb of Blackpool.

References

1964 births
American emigrants to Ireland
Labour Party (Ireland) politicians
Living people
Local councillors in Cork (city)
Members of the 32nd Dáil
Members of the 33rd Dáil
People Before Profit–Solidarity TDs
Socialist Party (Ireland) politicians